Lauderdale is an unincorporated community and census-designated place (CDP) in Lauderdale County, Mississippi, United States. The population of Lauderdale was 395 at the 2020 census.

Geography
The community is in the valley of Possum Creek, just south of where it joins Ponta Creek, an east-flowing tributary of the Sucarnoochee River, part of the Tombigbee River watershed.

Demographics 

As of the 2020 United States census, there were 395 people, 165 households, and 71 families residing in the CDP.

Notable people
 Lovell Harden, former Negro league pitcher
 Peggy Wilson, professional golfer who played on the LPGA Tour

Gallery

References

Census-designated places in Lauderdale County, Mississippi
Census-designated places in Meridian micropolitan area
Unincorporated communities in Mississippi
Unincorporated communities in Lauderdale County, Mississippi